Anette Dorothea Sophia Maria Nijs (born 16 December 1961) is a retired Dutch politician of the People's Party for Freedom and Democracy (VVD). She was the State Secretary for Education, Culture and Science in the Cabinets Balkenende I and II serving from 22 July 2002 until 9 June 2004. She was a Member of the House of Representatives from 30 January 2003 until 27 May 2003 and from 7 June 2005 until 30 November 2006.

Publications 
She published her second book on China called ‘The China Factor' in English in the summer of 2019. Her first book on China ‘China through different eyes’ was published in 2009 in Dutch in her home country, The Netherlands.

Awards 
Nijs received the Knighthood of Orange-Nassau, a royal award from The Netherlands in 2004. She also received the Chinese Government Friendship Award in 2015 – the highest recognition from the Chinese Central Government for foreigners, who have made a special contribution to China.

References

External links
  Drs. A.D.S.M. (Annette) Nijs MBA (Parlement & Politiek)

1961 births
Living people
State Secretaries for Education of the Netherlands
Members of the House of Representatives (Netherlands)
Dutch women in politics
People's Party for Freedom and Democracy politicians
Dutch economists
Dutch women economists
Dutch corporate directors
Dutch educators
Dutch women educators
Erasmus University Rotterdam alumni
Alumni of London Business School
Dutch expatriates in the United Kingdom
People from Waalwijk
20th-century Dutch businesswomen
20th-century Dutch businesspeople